This is a list of rank insignia of the United States Marine Corps (the maritime land forces of the United States of America). Different styles of rank insignia are worn on different marine uniforms.

Commissioned officers, which are distinguished from other officers by their commission, or formal written authority, have ranks that are subdivided into general officers, field-grade officers, and company-grade officers.

Warrant Officers provide leadership and training in specialized fields and skills. A Marine Gunner is a billet obtainable by E-7 who specialize in weapon systems and battlefield tactics. They are automatically promoted to CWO-2. In some cases a marine that already has a CWO rank can also be given the billet of Marine Gunner. They adopt the rank insignia of both an enlisted bursting bomb and a warrant officer insignia.

Enlisted Marines with paygrades of E-4 and E-5 are non-commissioned officers (NCOs) while those at E-6 and higher are Staff Noncommissioned Officers (SNCOs). The E-8 and E-9 levels each have two ranks per pay grade, each with different responsibilities. Gunnery Sergeants (E-7) indicate on their annual evaluations (called "fitness reports") their preferred promotional track: Master Sergeant or First Sergeant.

Commissioned officers
Commissioned officers are distinguished from other officers by their commission, which is the formal written authority, issued in the name of the President of the United States, that confers the rank and authority of a Marine Officer. Commissioned officers carry the "special trust and confidence" of the President of the United States. Commissioned officer ranks are further subdivided into general officers, field-grade officers, and company-grade officers. The highest billets in the Marine Corps, the Commandant of the Marine Corps and the Assistant Commandant of the Marine Corps are, by statute, four-star ranks, as the Marine Corps is a separate naval service under the Department of the Navy.

Warrant officers

Warrant Officers provide leadership and training in specialized fields and skills. Unlike other nations' militaries (which rank warrant officers as Staff NCO equivalents), the United States military confers warrants and commissions on its warrant officers and classifies them into a separate category senior to all enlisted grades of rank (including officer candidates), cadets, and midshipmen. As warrant officers are officer-level technical specialists they generally do not exercise command outside of their specialty. Warrant officers come primarily from the staff non-commissioned officer (SNCO) ranks.

A chief warrant officer, CWO2–CWO5, serving in the MOS 0306 "Infantry Weapons Officer" carries a special title, "Marine Gunner," which does not replace his rank. A Marine Gunner replaces the chief warrant officer insignia on the left collar with a bursting bomb insignia. Other warrant officers are sometimes incorrectly referred to as "Gunner".

Timeline of warrant officer rank changes

Enlisted
Enlisted Marines with paygrades of E-4 and E-5 are non-commissioned officers (NCOs) while those at E-6 and higher are Staff Noncommissioned Officers (SNCOs). The E-8 and E-9 levels each have two ranks per pay grade, each with different responsibilities. Gunnery Sergeants (E-7) indicate on their annual evaluations (called "fitness reports") their preferred promotional track: Master Sergeant or First Sergeant. The First Sergeant and Sergeant Major ranks are command-oriented Senior Enlisted Advisors, with Marines of these ranks serving as the senior enlisted Marines in a unit, charged to assist the commanding officer in matters of discipline, administration, and the morale and welfare of the unit. Master Sergeants and Master Gunnery Sergeants provide technical leadership as occupational specialists in their specific MOS. First Sergeants typically serve as the senior enlisted Marine in a company, battery, or other unit at a similar echelon, while Sergeants Major serve the same role in battalions, squadrons, or larger units.

The Sergeant Major of the Marine Corps is a billet and with it carries a special rank insignia, conferred on the senior enlisted Marine of the entire Marine Corps, personally selected by the Commandant of the Marine Corps. It, the recently created position of the Senior Enlisted Advisor to the Chairman and the Marine Gunner are the only billets which rate modified rank insignia in place of the traditional rank insignia.

Different styles of rank insignia are worn on different Marine uniforms:

Gold stripes on a red flash are worn on the Dress Blue uniform coat. Green stripes on a red flash are worn on the Service uniform coat. Rank insignia are worn on the upper sleeve of both coats. Khaki uniform shirts use green stripes on a khaki flash and are worn on the upper sleeves of both long and short-sleeved shirts. Utility uniform rank insignia are black metal pins and are worn on the collars, or black embroidered insignia sewn into patches of material when wearing armor. Musicians in the United States Marine Band wear insignia with lyre in the center as opposed to the crossed rifles, to denote their lack of a combat mission; full-service Marines who are attached to the 10 field bands of the Operating Forces and Supporting Establishment continue to wear their normal rank insignia. The crossed M1 rifles insignia were added to E-3 through E-8 chevrons in 1959.

Timeline of enlisted rank changes

See also

 British and United States military ranks compared
 Comparative military ranks
 List of United States Marine Corps acronyms and expressions for more nicknames and forms of address
 Ranks and insignia of NATO

Citations

General sources

External links
 Ranks at the official U.S. Marine Corps Website
 USMC Rank Chevrons through the ages...since 1917
 Marine Corps ranks at Military-Ranks.org

 
Military insignia